Route 3  is an important link in the north of Laos between China and Thailand. The 197 km route begins in the provincial capital Luang Namtha, Louang Namtha Province, Laos. It runs southwestwards reaching the provincial capital of Ban Houayxay, Bokeo Province, on river Mekong. On completion of the Fourth Thai-Lao Friendship Bridge it will end there. China is interested in improving traffic routes to Southeast Asia, to be financed with together with Thailand. China has the main share in the expansion of highways in Laos. The Laotian section is part of the Kunming–Bangkok Expressway, which is part of the Asian Highway AH3.

References

 http://www.irrawaddymedia.com/article.php?art_id=11229 

Roads in Laos
Mekong River